Holy Toledo was the Kingdom of Toledo, the juridical definition of a Christian medieval kingdom in what is now central Spain.

Holy Toledo may also refer to:
 Holy Toledos, a New Zealand folk-rock group
 "Holy Toledo", a song by Vundabar from Antics
 "Holy Toledo", a song by Gigolo Aunts from Everybody Happy
 "Holy Toledo", a song by Crystal Bowersox from Farmer's Daughter
 "Holy Toledo!", a song by Green Day from Mark, Mary & Some Other People
 "Holy Toledo!", a catchphrase of sportscasters Bill King and Milo Hamilton